Helping Grandma is a 1931 Our Gang short comedy film directed by Robert F. McGowan. It was the 103rd (15th talking episode) Our Gang short that was released.

Plot
An older woman named Mrs Margaret Mack owns a small grocery store and the gang helps her run it by waiting on customers, delivering groceries, and keeping her company. They call her Grandma, though she is not any one kid's grandmother but everyone's grandma. She loves the gang and the gang loves her. A chain store company wants to buy her store for more than market value while a swindler also wants to buy it for next to nothing.

The gang thinks both parties want to practically steal the store away from her. The swindler stops in and tries talking Grandma into selling her store immediately for $1,500. She balks at the low price, and then goes downtown to run some errands leaving the gang in charge. Among her instructions is to tell anyone who calls on the telephone to call back later.

Chain store officials then stop by and Jackie, Farina and Chubby try to scare them away from buying the store, telling them among other things that "You couldn't sell many chains in this town, anyhow," and "Even the banks close on Saturday afternoon." The chain store officials are amused by the kids and leave some papers for Mrs Mack to study, and they leave as well.  The swindler returns and sees it's a $3,500 contract of sale and takes it with him.

Meanwhile, Stymie is supposed to get 10 cents worth of "it" but can't remember what "it" is. He has a note naming it, but neither he nor Wheezer can read the note, so Wheezer asks Stymie if he'd remember it if he saw it, and Stymie says no, but he might remember it if he tasted it. Then Wheezer and the other kids have Stymie sample a potato, Peet Bros soap, shoe polish (?),  gasoline, moth balls, glue, Limburger cheese and finally fish-meal fertilizer, to which Stymie says "yep, that's it."

Then Dorothy is doling out candy to Wheezer when the phone rings. It's the chain store representatives, who want to increase their offer. Wheezer picks up the receiver but does not speak to the representatives, because he is distracted by Dorothy. Thinking she's not giving him enough candy (and therefore not hearing their offer), Wheezer shouts at Dorothy "T'aint enough!", then into the phone, "Call later!" The chain store reps think that "T'aint enough" was also meant for them and they decide to call back. This gag takes place repeatedly through the scene, with the chain store guys increasing their price and finally making a "flat offer of $5,000.00."

Grandma returns along with the swindler who is in a rush to get her to sign away her store. After several interruptions by the children, she signs the paper and assumes she has signed the store away; she tells the kids that she just sold the store. The man then calls the kids hoodlums and tells them the store is his and he is the boss and they must leave. Grandma refuses to let him throw them out. The chain store officials arrive and the swindler states that the store now belongs to him. He shows them the paper she signed but it was blank; the real contract of sale was not signed.  The swindler then accuses Grandma of tricking him.

The officials repeat their phone bid, saying they will give Grandma $1,500. more than the original price agreed upon; Grandma realizes that the swindler had pretended to be her over the phone and she socks the guy so hard he falls across the room. After he threatens Grandma by saying "I'll get you!"' Wheezer hits him on the head with a hammer.

Cast

The Gang
 Matthew Beard as Stymie ('Tumble-Weed' in script)
 Norman Chaney as Chubby
 Jackie Cooper as Jackie
 Dorothy DeBorba as Dorothy
 Allen Hoskins as Farina
 Bobby Hutchins as Wheezer
 Mary Ann Jackson as Mary Ann
 Shirley Jean Rickert as Shirley
 Donald Haines as Donald
 Clifton Young as Robert 'Bonedust'

Additional cast
 Oscar Apfel as Mr. Pennypacker
 William Gillespie as Billy, second chain store official
 Dell Henderson as First chain store official
 Margaret Mann as Mrs. Margaret 'Grandma' Mack
 Bobby Mallon as Undetermined role

Note
This episode was heavily edited on the Little Rascals television prints beginning in 1971. Scenes with Stymie tasting the store items were all cut out due to perceptions of racism toward African Americans. Most, but not all of the deleted scenes were reinstated on the TV prints shown on AMC from 2001–2003 and on MeTV in 2016.

See also
 Our Gang filmography

References

External links

1931 films
1931 comedy films
American black-and-white films
Films directed by Robert F. McGowan
Hal Roach Studios short films
Our Gang films
1931 short films
1930s American films